The  Eastern League season began on approximately April 1 and the regular season ended on approximately September 1. 

The Albany/Colonie Yankees defeated the Vermont Mariners three games to one to win the Eastern League Championship Series.

Regular season

Standings

Notes:
Green shade indicates that team advanced to the playoffs
Bold indicates that team advanced to ELCS
Italics indicates that team won ELCS

Playoffs

Semi-finals Series
Albany/Colonie Yankees defeated Glens Falls Tigers 3 games to 1.

Vermont Mariners defeated Pittsfield Cubs 3 games to 1.

Championship Series
Albany/Colonie Yankees defeated Vermont Mariners 3 games to 1.

Attendance

References

External links
1988 Eastern League Review at thebaseballcube.com

Eastern League seasons